The defending champions from 2010 were Vitalia Diatchenko and Eirini Georgatou, as there was no event in 2012 and the 2011 Soweto Open – Women's doubles tournament was cancelled due to heavy rain and flooding. Neither player participated in 2013.

Magda Linette and Chanel Simmonds won the title, defeating Samantha Murray and Jade Windley in the final, 6–1, 6–3.

Seeds

Draw

References 
 Draw

Soweto Open - Women's Doubles
2013 Doubles